Clarkia davyi is a species of flowering plant in the evening primrose family known by the common name Davy's fairyfan, or Davy's clarkia. It is endemic to California, where it grows in coastal habitats such as beaches and bluffs. This is an annual herb producing a thin stem which grows along the ground or somewhat upright. It is lined with small oval-shaped leaves one or two centimeters long. While in bud the flower is enclosed in four fused thick sepals. It blooms into a petite bowl-shaped corolla of four pink petals which often have lighter bases. Each petal is 5 to 11 millimeters long.

References

External links
Jepson Manual Profile
Photo gallery

davyi
Endemic flora of California
Plants described in 1907